Courthouse Square or Old Courthouse Square is an American term that usually refers to a square in the middle of a town, in which a courthouse, usually county courthouse, is located.

It may also refer to:

Courthouse Square, a movie production set at Universal Studios in Los Angeles, California
Courthouse Square Park, listed on the NRHP in Oregon
Old Courthouse Square (Lake Providence, Louisiana), listed on the NRHP in Louisiana

See also
Courthouse Square Historic District (disambiguation)
Court Square Historic District (disambiguation)
Pioneer Courthouse Square